Barbara Drummond (born August 5, 1956) is an American politician who has served in the Alabama House of Representatives from the 103rd district since 2014.

References

1956 births
Living people
Democratic Party members of the Alabama House of Representatives
21st-century American politicians